The Pheasant Breeding Centre, Morni is a purpose-built centre for the breeding of pheasants situated in Panchkula district in Morni, a village and tourist attraction in the Morni Hills in the Panchkula district of the Indian state of Haryana. 

History
 During the years 1992-93 to 1995-96 few eggs were collected from the wild and hatched at the centre.
 After 1996 most of the increase in the population of the birds came from breeding in the centre itself, using broody hens for brooding and hatching purposes.
 During the year 1998-99 fourteen birds born in the summer of 1998 were released in the forest area.
 In 1999 seven birds and in 2000 again 10 birds were released. Thus in all 31 sub-adult birds were released in the pre-selected proper habitat of the birds.

Types of pheasants bred

Several types of pheasants are bred, including red junglefowl (Gallus gallus), endangered  cheer pheasant (Catreus wallichii) and endangered kalij pheasant.

See also

 Pheasant Breeding Centre, Berwala in Panchkula district
 Vulture Conservation and Breeding Centre, Pinjore
 Peacock & Chinkara Breeding Centre, Jhabua, in Rewari district
 List of zoos in India
 List of National Parks & Wildlife Sanctuaries of Haryana, India
 Haryana Tourism
 List of Monuments of National Importance in Haryana
 List of State Protected Monuments in Haryana
 List of Indus Valley Civilization sites in Haryana, Punjab, Rajasthan, Gujarat, India & Pakistan

References 

Protected areas of Haryana
Panchkula district
Animal breeding organisations in India
Organisations based in Haryana
Protected areas with year of establishment missing